Corydoras robineae the banner-tail corydoras is a tropical freshwater fish belonging to the Corydoradinae sub-family of the family Callichthyidae. It originates in inland waters in South America. Corydoras robineae is restricted to the Upper Negro River basin.

Etymology
The fish is named in honor of Robine Schwartz, mother of aquarium-fish collector and exporter Adolfo Schwartz, who supplied the type specimen and asked that his mother be honored with the fishes name.

References

Burgess, W.E., 1992. Colored atlas of miniature catfish. Every species of Corydoras, Brochis and Aspidoras. T.F.H. Publications, Inc., USA. 224 p. 

Corydoras
Catfish of South America
Taxa named by Warren E. Burgess
Fish described in 1983